Rough Shoot, released in the USA as Shoot First, is a 1953 British thriller film directed by Robert Parrish and written by Eric Ambler, based on the 1951 novel by Geoffrey Household. The film stars Joel McCrea, in his only postwar non-Western role, with Evelyn Keyes as the leading lady, and featuring Herbert Lom, Marius Goring and Roland Culver. The scenario is set in Cold War England when tensions ran high regarding spying.

Plot
A U.S. Army colonel Robert Taine (Joel McCrea) living in the English countryside shoots at a man he takes to be a poacher on Taine's rented property in Dorset.

The man named Reimann (Denis Lehre), has been mortally wounded but Robert is unaware that a foreign spy named Hiart (Marius Goring) simultaneously shot Reimann. Believing he has killed the poacher, Robert hides Reimann's body under a shrub. Robert encounters Hiart and his driver, Diss (Karel Stepanek) looking for the body.

Later that night, Hiart's colleague, Magda Hassingham (Patricia Laffan), discusses the incident with him. Magda's drunkard husband (Frank Lawton), the major landowner in the area, is ignorant of her involvement with enemy agents.

Intending to bury Reimann the next day, Robert finds Peter Sandorski (Herbert Lom), a Polish operative for British military intelligence. Sandorski enlists his help with a secret operation to foil a gang out to steal atomic secrets. British Colonel Cartwright (Cyril Raymond) introduces Robert and his wife Cecily (Evelyn Keyes) to government official Randall (Roland Culver) who confirms Sandorski's identity and story and instructs Robert to cooperate with Sandorski.

When Randall leaves, Robert confesses to Cecily he has accidentally killed a man. Cecily insists on accompanying her husband and Sandorski to a nearby field where an enemy agent is expected to land an aircraft. While Cecily stays in the car, Robert and Sandorski see Hiart, Magda and their assistants arrange landing beacons.

When he overhears that the agent, identified as Lex (David Hurst), will only be in town for 48 hours, Sandorski decides to capture him. By moving a beacon, the landing is disrupted, allowing Sandorski who is impersonating Hiart to grab the spy. Sandorski tosses grenades so they cannot be followed.

While Robert and Cecily impersonate the Hassinghams, Sandorski drugs Lex so he will sleep. The next morning police discover Reimann's body. Diss, meanwhile, attempts to locate Lex and learns about Robert and Cecily's unusual houseguests from their housekeeper's son, Tommy Powell (Robert Dickens). After police inspectors Matthews (Jack McNaughton) of Dorchester and Sullivan (Clement McCallin) of Scotland Yard question Robert and take one of his boots to compare to the prints found near Reimann's body. Robert insists they all leave for London, where Lex has a meeting.

On Robert's instruction, Mrs. Powell (Megs Jenkins) contacts Randall  with a request to call off Scotland Yard. Hiart pursues Robert, Cecily, Sandorski and Lex who arrive at a train station where Randall makes contact with Cecily, who admits that her husband killed Reimann.

While on the train to London, Cecily takes Lex's briefcase while he is asleep. At the London train station Hiart manages to alert Lex, who escapes. However, the next day at London's Madame Tussaud's Wax Museum, Randall and Sandorski arrest Lex after he passes an envelope to an unidentified spy. Lex and the spy are arrested, but Hiart and Diss flee.

Sandorski shoots Diss during a pursuit in a stairwell, and Hiart is killed when he opens Lex's briefcase, triggering an explosion. Randall later reveals to Robert and Cecily that Lex, a scientist, was brought to England to interpret stolen reports about British atomic weapons trials in Australia. He and Sullivan then inform a relieved Robert that it was Hiart who killed Reimann. Before departing, Sandorski cautions Cecily that any future strange behaviour by her husband may be related to espionage.

Cast

 Joel McCrea as Lt. Col. Robert Taine 
 Evelyn Keyes as Cecily Taine 
 Herbert Lom as Peter Sandorski 
 Roland Culver as Randall 
 Marius Goring as Hiart 
 Frank Lawton as Hassingham 
 Patricia Laffan as Magda Hassingham
 Cyril Raymond as Cartwright 
 Karel Stepanek as Diss 
 Jack McNaughton as Inspector Matthews 
 Clement McCallin as Inspector Sullivan
 David Hurst as Lex 
 Denis Lehrer as Reimann 
 Laurence Naismith as Blossom 
 Megs Jenkins as Mrs. Powell 
 Robert Dickens as Tommy 
 Arnold Bell as Sergeant Baines 
 Ellis Irving as Wharton 
 Joan Hickson as Station announcer

Production
Inspired by Geoffrey Household's novel Run from the Hangman (1953), Rough Shoot was filmed on location in England. Studio work took place at Riverside Studios, London. Some scenes were shot in Madame Tussaud's Wax Museum in London.

Reception
In a contemporary review of Shoot First (the title of the U.S. release), Variety magazine declared: "McCrea is excellent as the colonel forced by circumstances into the counterplot, and Keyes is appealing and believable as his wife. Lom scores as the swash-buckling counterspy, making a completely engaging character out of what's intended as a caricature. Goring scores as the fanatic foreign agent, and Karl Stepanek is excellent as his brutal sidekick. Robert Parrish's inventive direction keeps the story moving at a rapid pace."

Film reviewer Leslie Halliwell in Leslie Halliwell's Film Guide (1989), noted that Rough Shoot was a "minor Hitchcock-style thriller with a climax in Madame Tussauds; generally efficient and entertaining."

References

Notes

Citations

Bibliography

 Halliwell, Leslie. Leslie Halliwell's Film Guide. New York: Harper & Roe, 1989. .
 Milne, Tom. "Review: 'Rough Shoot'(aka 'Shoot First')" in Pym, John, ed. Time Out Film Guide. London: Time Out Guides Limited, 2004. .

External links

Sterritt, David. Shoot First (1953), article on TCM.com

1953 films
1950s thriller films
Films directed by Robert Parrish
British drama films
British thriller films
British spy films
British black-and-white films
Cold War spy films
1950s English-language films
1950s British films